Charles Cochon Lapparent (24 January 1750 in Champdeniers-Saint-Denis – 17 July 1825 in Poitiers) was a French politician and Minister of Police.

He was born into a bourgeois family that was formerly Protestant, a religion they were required to recant. Lapparent was elected deputy of the Third Estate, and he held important functions in the National Convention, in the armies of the Republic and the committee of public health. On 9 Thermidor, he participated in the fall of Robespierre. During a meeting of the French Directory he was appointed minister of police.  However, he was accused of being royalist and deported. During the time of the Consulate and the First French Empire, he held important posts, but in 1815 he was forced to leave France, being allowed to return to Poitiers after a year of exile.

References

1750 births
1825 deaths
People from Deux-Sèvres
Deputies to the French National Convention
Représentants en mission